The Altai falcon (Falco cherrug altaicus?) is a large falcon of questionable taxonomic position. It is often considered to be a subspecies of the  saker falcon (Falco cherrug).  It used to have a high reputation among Central Asian falconers. It is uncertain whether the bird is a saker subspecies or a hybrid.

Distribution and taxonomy
The Altai falcon breeds in a relatively small area of Central Asia across the Altai and Sayan Mountains. This area overlaps with the much larger breeding area of the saker falcon (Falco cherrug). It appears that Altai falcons are either natural hybrids between sakers and gyrfalcons (Falco rusticolus), or rather the descendants of such rare hybrids backcrossing into the large population of sakers.

So far, molecular genetic studies cannot prove or falsify the hybrid hypothesis. Gyrfalcons are rare winter vagrants to the Altai falcon's range. The high altitude cold grasslands of the region constitute habitat intermediate between typical saker habitat (temperate lowland steppes) and typical gyrfalcon habitat (arctic tundra). These two species of falcons also easily hybridise in captivity.

Thus the Altai falcon is tentatively considered to be a saker subspecies Falco cherrug altaicus. It tends to be larger than typical sakers and has red-backed, brownish and greyish colour varieties.

Literature

 Almásy Gy 1903. Vándor-utam Ázsia szívébe. (My Travels to the Heart of Asia – in Hungarian) Budapest, Természettudományi Könyvkiadó-vállalat.
 Eastham CP, Nicholls MK, Fox NC 2002. Morphological variation of the saker (Falco cherrug) and the implications for conservation. Biodiversity and Conservation, 11, 305–325.
 Ellis DH 1995. What is Falco altaicus Menzbier? Journal of Raptor Research, 29, 15–25.
Menzbier MA 1891. (1888–1893). Ornithologie du Turkestan et des pays adjacents (Partie No. -O. de la Mongolie, steppes Kirghiz, contree Aralo-Caspienne, partie superieure du bassin d'Oxus, Pamir). Vol. 12. Publiee par l'Auteur, Moscow, Russia.
 Nittinger F, Gamauf A, Pinsker W, Wink M, Haring E 2007. Phylogeography and population structure of the saker falcon (Falco cherrug) and the influence of hybridization: mitochondrial and microsatellite data. Molecular Ecology, 16, 1497–1517.
 Orta J 1994. 57. Saker Falcon. In: del Hoyo J, Elliott A,  Sargatal J (eds.): Handbook of Birds of the World, Volume 2: New World Vultures to Guineafowl: 273–274, plate 28. Lynx Edicions, Barcelona. 
 Pfander 2011. Semispecies and Unidentified Hidden Hybrids (for Example of Birds of Prey) Raptors Conservation 23: 74-105.
 Potapov E, Sale R 2005. The Gyrfalcon. Poyser Species Monographs. A & C Black Publishers, London.
 Sushkin PP 1938. Birds of the Soviet Altai and adjacent parts of north-western Mongolia. Vol. 1. [In Russian.] Academy of Science of USSR Press, Moscow, Russia.

External Links to rare Photos
 Altai falcon, Western Mongolia
 Altai falcon, Western Mongolia
 Altai falcon, Kazakhstan

Altai falcon
Falconry
Birds of Mongolia
Controversial bird taxa
Bird hybrids
Altai falcon